Microsynodontis polli is a species of upside-down catfish native to Guinea from the Gbin River and Liberia from Saint John.  This species grows to a length of  TL.

Etymology
The catfish is named in honor of ichthyologist Max Poll, the Curator, of the Musée de Congo Belge in  Tervuren.

References

External links 
 Photograph of Microsynodontis polli in FishBase

Mochokidae
Freshwater fish of West Africa
Taxa named by Jacques G. Lambert
Fish described in 1958